Ian Clayton (born 4 September 1959 in Featherstone, Yorkshire) is an English writer and broadcaster. In a freelance career spanning 20 years he has edited and authored more than forty books and broadcast on TV and radio. He has run education workshops from infant schools to universities, working regularly with musicians on opera and music theatre projects.  He has worked across Europe as well as China and the United States.

Current work

Clayton worked with Yorkshire Art Circus for twenty-five years and presented a documentary series for Yorkshire Television called My Yorkshire. He is a regular radio broadcaster and workshop leader for numerous cultural institutions.

Canoeing incident

In April, 2006 Clayton's nine-year-old daughter Billie died in a canoeing accident in Powys, Wales in which her father and twin brother Edward survived. Following an inquest into her death in 2008 - which recorded a verdict of misadventure - Clayton criticised the canoe hire industry and called for it to be more strictly regulated.

Selected books

Right Up Your Street: The Express Columns Volume One (Route Publishing, 2015)
Wisdom of our Own: Living and Learning Since the Miners' Strike (CCLC, 2015)
Song For My Father (Route Publishing, 2014 (Paperback)  (Hardback) privately published)
Bringing It All Back Home (Route Publishing, 2007 (Hardback)  (Paperback) )
Entertaining Angels (Saint George's Church & Crypt, 2002 )
What the Eck Is That Over There? (Yorkshire Art Circus, 1996 )
When Push Comes To Shove Volume 2 - Centenary Edition (Yorkshire Art Circus, 1995)
When Push Comes To Shove (Yorkshire Art Circus, 1993) - The Sunday Times Sports Book of the Year
Running For Clocks and Dessert Spoons (Yorkshire Art Circus, 1988)

Visiting Scholar

In 2013 and 2015, Ian Clayton was visiting scholar in creative writing at North East Normal University in Changchun, China, where he was invited to give the Masters Lecture at the media school, and was a guest lecturer at Jilin University.

Selected projects as writing workshop leader.

Academy of St Martin in the Fields.
Opera North.
London Sinfonietta.
English National Opera at Sky TV.
Royal Festival Hall.
Benjamin Britton School of Advanced Music Study.
National Youth Orchestra Summer School.

Television

With a little Help from our Friends - UNESCO prize nominee.
Wakefield Jailhouse Opera - BBC Late Show.
My Yorkshire - Yorkshire TV.

Radio

Still angry after all these years - BBC Radio 4

Film

Prometheus - Dir. Tony Harrison.

References

External links
 Official Site

Living people
English television presenters
English male writers
ITV regional newsreaders and journalists
People from Featherstone
1959 births